The 2019  Chennai water crisis was a water crisis occurring in India, most notably in the coastal city of Chennai in Tamil Nadu. On 19 June 2019, Chennai city officials declared that "Day Zero", or the day when almost no water is left, had been reached, as all the four main reservoirs supplying water to the city had run dry. Two years of deficient monsoon rainfall, particularly in late 2017 and throughout much of 2018 had led to this crisis.

Because tap water has stopped running, some families have been relying on alternative water sources such as distant, unreliable public water pumps, and costly private water tankers.

Background

Chennai is a city of over 11 million people, around the size of New York City, and is the fourth largest city in India. The city is an automotive engineering hub and contains many automotive factories that are built around the reservoirs of the city.  Mismanagement of the city’s water resources and weak monsoons for the last four years reduced the city’s reservoirs to 0.1% of normal capacity in June 2019. Water became a valuable resource in Chennai and experienced exploitation as wealthier residents paid to dig deep bore wells on their land and sold water to other residents or businesses. This practice was allowed by the government and resulted in the groundwater aquifer to be drained dramatically at twice the level of annual recharge. Protests erupted over the Chennai government’s lack of action on the issue as the water was no longer a basic human right in Chennai. The government also faced pressure on their management of the city’s four main reservoirs; Poondi, Cholavaram, Redhills and Chembarambakkam. Factories and infrastructure built in the catchments of these reservoirs were unregulated and therefore much of the rain that fell ended up in the ocean or used in excess by these factories. This further exacerbated the issue and limited the amount of water that entered the reservoirs for public consumption. Monsoon rains in 2019 have been more plentiful than in years past and have raised the reservoir levels to around 30% capacity. Chennai has declared itself water secure because of the recent rains but concern remains about the future of water security in Chennai and many other Indian cities such as Bangalore which have similar regulation issues. An Indian government think tank predicted that 21 Indian cities will be out of groundwater by 2020, and the impact of future droughts in India brought upon by climate change will put the entire country at risk unless stronger regulations are put in place.

Chennai has historically relied on annual monsoon rains to replenish its water reservoirs since the rivers are polluted with sewage.

There are four reservoirs in the city, namely, Red Hills, Cholavaram, Poondi and Chembarambakkam, with a combined capacity of 11,057 mcft.

Extreme drought
Three years of failed monsoon in 2016, 2017, and 2018. The 2018  monsoon season was one of the driest ever recorded in Chennai, as only 343.7 mm of rain had fallen compared to an average of 757.6 mm, which was a 55% rainfall deficit. Additionally, the entire state of Tamil Nadu had recorded a 23% rainfall deficit in that season. A major heatwave in India from May to June 2019 further increasing the problem by evaporating any water still left in reservoirs.

Government mismanagement
Government mismanagement and unplanned construction has also been a factor to blame for this crisis.

Impact
Millions of people are without consistent access to water. A lack of rainwater and groundwater has left four reservoirs that supply water to the city completely dry. The inability to meet the demand for water has forced businesses like hotels and restaurants to close. Water tankers from areas of Tamil Nadu unaffected by drought have been bringing water into some areas of the city. However, government tankers can take up to a month to appear after requested, so many families, wealthy residents, and business owners have opted to pay for costly private water tankers.

Many fights over water have also broken out due to the conflict. In one such conflict that occurred on 15 June 2019, a woman was stabbed and the perpetrator was turned in to the police.

See also 
 Cape Town water crisis – a similar water crisis that occurred in Cape Town, South Africa in 2018

References 

2010s in Chennai
Water scarcity
2019 disasters in India
Water in India

Further reading